The 1981 NHK Trophy was held in Kobe. Medals were awarded in the disciplines of men's singles, ladies' singles, pair skating, and ice dancing.

Results

Men

Ladies

Pairs

Ice dancing

External links
 1981 NHK Trophy

Nhk Trophy, 1981
NHK Trophy